Trickle-down economics is a term used in critical references to economic policies to say they disproportionately favor the upper end of the economic spectrum, i.e. wealthy investors and large corporations. In recent history, the term has been used broadly by critics of supply-side economics. Major US examples of what critics have called "trickle-down economics" include the Reagan tax cuts, the Bush tax cuts, and the Tax Cuts and Jobs Act of 2017. Major UK examples include the tax cut policies of Margaret Thatcher, the economic policies of Friedrich Hayek, and Liz Truss's mini-budget tax cuts of 2022. As of 2023, a number of studies have failed to demonstrate a link between reducing tax burdens on the upper end and economic growth.

Trickle-down economics contrasts with the trickle-up effect which is more associated with demand-side economics.

History 

The Google Ngram Viewer shows that the term "trickle down economics" was rarely seen in published works until the 1980s. However, the concept that economic prosperity in the upper classes flows down into the lower classes is at least 100 years old. The term itself is used mostly by critics of the concept.

In 1896, United States Democratic presidential candidate William Jennings Bryan described the concept using the metaphor of a "leak" in his 

In 1982 John Kenneth Galbraith wrote that "trickle-down economics" was known in the 1890s under the name "horse-and-sparrow theory".

William J. Bennett credits humorist and social commentator Will Rogers for coining the term and noted in 2007 its persistent use throughout the decades since. In a 1932 column criticizing Herbert Hoover's policies and approach to The Great Depression Rogers wrote:

In 1933, Indian nationalist and stateman Jawaharlal Nehru wrote positively of the term (in the sense that wealth entered upper classes then "trickled down") in critical reference to the colonial seizing of wealth in India and other territories being a cause of increased the wealth in England:

The Merriam-Webster Dictionary notes that the first known use of "trickle-down" as an adjective meaning "relating to or working on the principle of trickle-down theory" was in 1944 while the first known use of "trickle-down theory" was in 1954.

After leaving the presidency, Democrat Lyndon B. Johnson alleged "Republicans ... simply don't know how to manage the economy. They're so busy operating the trickle-down theory, giving the richest corporations the biggest break, that the whole thing goes to hell in a handbasket."

Presidential speechwriter Samuel Rosenman wrote in 2008 that "trickle down policies" had been prevalent in American government since 1921.

Political scientists Brainard Guy Peters and Maximilian Lennart Nagel in 2020 labeled the idea usually expressed as 'trickle down' a "zombie idea", and stated that it has been the most enduring failed policy idea in American politics.

Usage 

While the term "trickle-down" is commonly used to refer to income benefits, it is sometimes used to refer to the idea of positive externalities arising from technological innovation or increased trade.  Arthur Okun, and separately William Baumol, for example, have used the term to refer to the flow of the benefits of innovation, which do not accrue entirely to the "great entrepreneurs and inventors", but trickle down to the masses.  And Nobel laureate economist Paul Romer used the term in reference to the impact on wealth from tariff changes.

Despite a lack of practical-use evidence for the Laffer curve, it is often cited by proponents of trickle-down policy.

Economics 

Thomas Sowell consistently argues that trickle-down economics has never been advocated by any economist, writing in his 2012 book "Trickle Down" Theory and "Tax Cuts for the Rich":

Sowell has also written extensively on supply-side economics and opposes its characterization firmly, citing that it has never claimed to work in a "trickle-down" fashion. Rather, the economic theory of reducing marginal tax rates works in precisely the opposite direction: "Workers are always paid first and then profits flow upward later – if at all."

John Kenneth Galbraith noted that "trickle-down economics" had been tried before in the United States in the 1890s under the name "horse-and-sparrow theory", writing:

Galbraith theorized that the horse-and-sparrow theory was partly to blame for the Panic of 1896.

Nobel laureate Joseph Stiglitz wrote in 2015 that the post-World War II evidence does not support trickle-down economics, but rather "trickle-up economics" whereby more money in the pockets of the poor or the middle benefits everyone.

Nobel laureate Paul Krugman has also been sharply critical of trickle-down policies.

A paper by Harvard-Kennedy School social scientist Christopher Jencks found no relationship between top income growth and overall economic growth.

In a 2020 research paper, economists David Hope and Julian Limberg analyzed data spanning 50 years from 18 countries, and found that tax cuts for the rich only succeeded at increasing inequality and making the rich wealthier, with no beneficial effect on real GDP per capita or employment. According to the study, this shows that the tax cuts for the upper class did not trickle down to the broader economy.

A 2015 IMF staff discussion note by Era Dabla-Norris, Kalpana Kochhar, Nujin Suphaphiphat, Frantisek Ricka and Evridiki Tsounta
suggests that lowering taxes on the top 20% could actually reduce growth.

Friedrich Hayek's economic theories have also been described as trickle-down.

Politics 
In the US, Republican tax plans and policies are often labeled "trickle-down economics", including the Reagan tax cuts, the Bush tax cuts and the Tax Cuts and Jobs Act of 2017. In each of the aforementioned tax reforms, taxes were cut across all income brackets, but the biggest reductions were given to the highest income earners, although the Reagan Era tax reforms also introduced the earned income tax credit which has received bipartisan praise for poverty reduction and is largely why the bottom half of workers pay no federal income tax. Similarly, the Tax Cuts and Jobs Act of 2017 cut taxes across all income brackets, but especially favored the wealthy.

Ronald Reagan's former budget director, championed Reagan's tax cuts at first, but later became critical of them and told journalist William Greider that "supply-side economics" is the trickle-down idea:

Political opponents of the Reagan administration soon seized on this language in an effort to brand the administration as caring only about the wealthy. Some studies suggest a link between trickle-down economics and reduced growth, and some newspapers concluded that trickle-down economics does not promote jobs or growth, and that "policy makers shouldn't worry that raising taxes on the rich ... will harm their economies".

While running against Ronald Reagan for the Presidential nomination in 1980, George H. W. Bush had derided the trickle-down approach as "voodoo economics". In the 1992 presidential election, independent candidate Ross Perot also referred to trickle-down economics as "political voodoo". In the same election during a presidential town hall debate, Bill Clinton said:

Speaking on the Senate floor in 1992, Hank Brown (Republican senator for Colorado) said: "Mr. President, the trickle-down theory attributed to the Republican Party has never been articulated by President Reagan and has never been articulated by President Bush and has never been advocated by either one of them. One might argue whether trickle-down makes any sense or not. To attribute to people who have advocated the opposite in policies is not only inaccurate but poisons the debate on public issues."

The political campaign group, Tax Justice Network has used the term referring broadly to wealth inequality in its criticisms of tax havens.

In 2013, Pope Francis referred to "trickle-down theories" in his apostolic exhortation  with the following statement (No. 54):

In New Zealand, Damien O'Connor, an MP from the Labour Party, called trickle-down economics "the rich pissing on the poor" in the Labour Party campaign launch video for the 2011 general election. In a 2016 presidential candidates debate, Hillary Clinton accused Donald Trump of supporting the "most extreme" version of trickle-down economics with his tax plan, calling it "trumped-up trickle-down" as a pun on his name. In his speech to a joint session of Congress on April 28, 2021, US President Joe Biden stated that "trickle-down economics has never worked". Biden has continued to be critical of trickle-down.

A Columbia journal article comparing a failed UK Enterprise Zone proposal to later US proposals references them as a form of trickle-down policy where lower regulatory and tax burdens were aimed at wealthier developers with the hope they would benefit residents.

Political commentator Robert Reich has implicated institutions such as the Heritage Foundation, Cato Institute, and Club for Growth for promoting what he considers to be a discredited idea.

Kansas governor and politician Sam Brownback's 2018 tax cut package was widely labelled as an attempt at trickle-down economics.

See also 

 Reaganomics
 Thatcherism
 Laffer curve
 A rising tide lifts all boats
 Trussonomics
 Austerity (21st century economic meaning)
 Classical economics
 Economic inequality
 Keynesian economics
 Matthew effect
 Neoclassical economics
 Neoliberalism
 Palace economy
 Progressive tax

References

Further reading 
 
 Gerald Marvin Meier, Joseph E. Stiglitz (2001) Frontiers of Development Economics: The Future in Perspective p. 422.
 Karla Hoff and Joseph E. Stiglitz (1998) Adverse Selection and Institutional Adaptation – Department of Economics Working Paper Series/University of Maryland, College Park, Dept. of Economics; no. 98–102.
 
 Randy P. Albelda, June Lapidus, Elaine McCrate and Edwin Melendez (1988). Mink Coats Don't Trickle Down: The Economic Attack on Women and People of Color. .
 “Reaganomics: A Watershed Moment,Reaganomics A Watershed Moment on the Road to Trumpism.pdf," The Economists’ Voice, 2019, 16: 1.

External links 

 John Miller. "Ronald Reagan's Legacy".
 
 "Trickle-down economics is the greatest broken promise of our lifetime" (January 20, 2014). The Guardian.
 "The 'trickle down theory' is dead wrong" (June 15, 2015). CNNMoney.

1930s neologisms
Economic ideologies
Neoliberalism
Political terminology of the United States
Satire
Reagan Era